Passe may refer to:

 Passe, Angola, a commune in Angola
 Passe, Ouest, a village in Haiti
 Passe language, an extinct language of South America
 Passé, an English adjective meaning "outdated"
 Loel Passe (1917–1997), American sports announcer

See also 
 
 La Passe FC, a football club of the Seychelles
 Passe-passe, a 2008 French film
 Zec des Passes, a protected area in Canada
 Passee, a municipality in Germany
 Pase (disambiguation)